Cosmos longipetiolatus is a Mexican species of plants in the family Asteraceae. It has been found only in the state of Jalisco in southern Mexico.

Cosmos longipetiolatus is a branching perennial, producing thick, tuberous roots underground. Leaves are highly divided into many small lobes and leaflets. Each plant produces numerous flower heads, with purple or lavender ray florets and yellow disc florets.

References

External links

longipetiolatus
Plants described in 1967
Flora of Jalisco